Paul Hudson (born 14 October 1967) is a British businessman, and the chief executive (CEO) of Sanofi, the world's fifth largest pharmaceutical company by prescription drug sales.

Early life
Hudson earned a degree in economics from Manchester Metropolitan University, and a diploma in marketing from the Chartered Institute of Marketing.

Career
Hudson has been CEO of Sanofi since September 2019.

Hudson was previously CEO of Novartis Pharmaceuticals, and before that AstraZeneca, rising to President, AstraZeneca United States and Executive Vice President, North America.

Recognition
Hudson was awarded an honorary doctorate by Manchester Metropolitan University in 2018.

Personal life
Hudson has three children with his wife Sandra and is an "ardent Manchester United football fan".

References

Living people
British chief executives
Alumni of Manchester Metropolitan University
1960s births
Sanofi people
Novartis people
AstraZeneca people
GSK plc people